The Ol' Gray Hoss is a 1928 Our Gang short silent comedy film directed by Anthony Mack. It was the 78th Our Gang short released.

Cast

The Gang
 Joe Cobb as Joe
 Jean Darling as Jean
 Allen Hoskins as Farina
 Bobby Hutchins as Wheezer
 Mary Ann Jackson as Mary Ann
 Harry Spear as Harry
 Jimmy Farren as Our Gang member
 Pete the Pup as himself

Additional cast
 Charles A. Bachman as Officer Mulligan
 Richard Cummings as Chief Cummings
 Mary Gordon as First taxi passenger
 Tenen Holtz as Bearded man
 Charles A. Millsfield as man getting splattered
 Ellinor Vanderveer as Dowager
 Charley Young as Creditor

See also
 Our Gang filmography

References

External links

1928 films
1928 comedy films
1928 short films
American silent short films
American black-and-white films
Films directed by Robert A. McGowan
Metro-Goldwyn-Mayer short films
Our Gang films
1920s American films
Silent American comedy films
1920s English-language films